The 1990 AFL Grand Final was an Australian rules football game contested between the Collingwood Football Club and the Essendon Football Club, held at the Melbourne Cricket Ground in Melbourne on 6 October 1990. It was the 94th annual grand final of the Australian Football League (formerly the Victorian Football League), staged to determine the premiers for the 1990 AFL season. The match, attended by 98,944 spectators, was won by Collingwood by a margin of 48 points, marking that club's 14th premiership victory.

Background

During the first half of the 20th century Collingwood was very successful, winning the majority of its premierships during this time. However since winning the 1958 VFL Grand Final, Collingwood had made nine unsuccessful grand final attempts in 32 years (including a draw in the 1977 VFL Grand Final against North Melbourne). Essendon had last played a grand final in 1985, which it had won against Hawthorn; that match was the last game of Collingwood coach and then-Hawthorn forward Leigh Matthews' playing career.

At the conclusion of the home and away season, Essendon had finished first on the AFL ladder with 17 wins and 5 losses. Collingwood had finished second with 16 wins and 6 losses. The top five qualified for the finals, which were played under the McIntyre final five system.

Collingwood and West Coast played a draw in the qualifying final at Waverley Park in the first week of the finals. The match was replayed the following week, with Collingwood winning convincingly by 59 points to advance to the second semi-final against Essendon. In the second-semi final, Collingwood scored ten goals to two after half time to win by 63 points and advance to the grand final. Essendon faced West Coast in the preliminary final, winning by 63 points, to earn its place in the grand final.

Collingwood's drawn qualifying final with West Coast caused the grand final and all other finals to be delayed by a week from the originally scheduled dates, which proved both controversial and commercially challenging. It was controversial because, when Essendon played the second semi-final, it had been 21 days since its last competitive match (having received the minor premier's bye, followed by a bye for the replayed final); although the club played an unofficial practice match against 12th-placed Fitzroy during the second week, the extra week off was thought to have affected Essendon's form and contributed to its losses in the second semi-final and, ultimately, the grand final. It also caused an unprecedented commercial and logistical challenge as a large number of league and corporate events related to grand final week, had to be rescheduled, impacting travel, venues and hotels; drawn finals had occurred before, but the number and scale of corporate grand final week events had increased significantly since the last time a drawn finals match forced the grand final to be rescheduled in 1972. As a result, starting from 1991, the rules were changed to allow extra time to be played in drawn finals (excluding the grand final) to ensure the grand final date would not change.

Match summary

First quarter
The match began with Essendon starting strongly, as the Bombers' beanpole full-forward Paul Salmon kicked two early goals from strong marks. The signs looked ominous for Collingwood who were unable to penetrate before a classic goal by Peter Daicos from the boundary followed by a late goal by Gavin Brown from an Essendon turnover gave the inaccurate Magpies a three-point lead, and considerable momentum, at the first change.

Quarter time brawl
At the sounding of the quarter time siren, a wild brawl erupted in the Essendon forward pocket drawing all players on the ground and spreading to include team officials. During the brawl, Gavin Brown was flattened by Terry Daniher in retaliation for Brown felling Kieran Sporn. The umpires, police, stadium security and Channel Seven boundary rider Bernie Quinlan were needed to restore order. In the aftermath ten players and officials were reported (see below for details). The violent brawl, beamed live across Australia and the world, shocked viewers, fans and officials alike, and would be the catalyst for the AFL to crack down on violence in the game, leading to greater penalties and severe fines for players engaging in brawls.

Second quarter
Following the brawl, the umpires took a hard line on any indiscretions. Collingwood, playing in front at the contests, benefitted from this, and won several free kicks and fifty metre penalties, from which they scored five goals in the first nine minutes of the quarter. Essendon never really recovered from this purple patch, and after finishing with six goals to one in the second quarter, Collingwood led by 34 points at half time.

Third quarter
Collingwood continued strongly after half time, whilst Kevin Sheedy had shuffled his Essendon players into different position all across the ground in an attempt to bridge the deficit, mirroring his successful 3/4 time efforts in the 1984 VFL Grand Final. Craig Starcevich was knocked out by Terry Daniher after taking a mark, with Mick McGuane taking his kick and scoring from the resultant 50 metre penalty. Peter Daicos scored a spectacular goal from near the behind post to extend Collingwood's margin to 46 points. Essendon scored the next two goals midway through the third quarter with two quick goals, before Gavin Brown goaled late to give Collingwood a 40-point lead at three-quarter time.

Fourth quarter
Essendon attacked and dominated the play early in the last quarter but could only manage behinds, including hitting the post twice from set shots. After absorbing the Essendon pressure for twenty minutes, Collingwood's Doug Barwick scored the first goal of the quarter, with a snap shot from 25 metres. The siren sounded soon after Damian Monkhorst scored to make the margin 48 points. Essendon was held goalless in the final quarter.

The Norm Smith Medal was awarded to Collingwood's Tony Shaw for being judged the best player afield, with 32 possessions in an inspirational display. He was the first team captain to be awarded the medal.

This win represented the first for Leigh Matthews as coach. He had previously captained Hawthorn to grand finals in the 1980s, and later went on to coach the Brisbane Lions to three premierships (the first of them against Kevin Sheedy's Bombers) in the 2000s.

Many of Essendon's senior players would retire or move on in the following two seasons, however their next grand final appearance came three years later, when the Baby Bombers (so named because of the high number of players they had under 21) surprised the football world and won the 1993 AFL Grand Final against Carlton. Collingwood did not win another premiership for 20 years, until they defeated St Kilda in 2010.

Teams

Scorecard

Statistics

Tribunal
Ten players and officials were reported on a total of seventeen offences as a result of the brawl:
Terry Daniher (Essendon): Charged with striking Gavin Brown and striking Craig Starcevich. Suspended for 12 matches.
Graeme Allan (Colllingwood football manager): Charged with striking Essendon runner Peter Power and conduct unbecoming of a team official. Suspended for six matches and fined $15,000.
Eddie Hillgrove (Colllingwood team manager): Charged with assaulting Essendon bootstudder Graham Menola and conduct unbecoming of a team official. Suspended for six matches and fined $7,500.
Darren Bewick (Essendon): Charged with striking and rough conduct against Tony Shaw, kneeing Denis Banks, and striking Doug Barwick. Cleared of first three charges; suspended for four matches.
Gavin Brown (Colllingwood): Charged with striking Kieran Sporn. Suspended for three matches.
Kieran Sporn (Essendon): Charged with striking Denis Banks. Suspended for two matches.
John Synan (Essendon doorman):  Charged with charging Colllingwood team manager Eddie Hillgrove and conduct unbecoming of a team official. Fined $5,000.
Craig Kelly (Colllingwood) and Paul Van Der Haar (Essendon): Charged with striking each other. Both found not guilty.
Derek Kickett (Essendon): Charged with striking Mick McGuane. Found not guilty.

Postscript
In a tragic postscript, Collingwood player Darren Millane, who was in possession of the ball when the final siren sounded, died in a car accident one year and one day after this match.

See also
1990 AFL season

References

VFL/AFL Grand Finals
1990 Australian Football League season
Afl Grand Final, 1990
Collingwood Football Club
Essendon Football Club